The Safe Schools Act is an Ontario bill, implemented in 2000 to provide a definitive set of regulations for punishments that must be issued for students. The bill is often referred to as a zero-tolerance policy, however "the presence of mitigating factors in the Act and school board policies precludes it from being strictly defined as a zero tolerance regime".
Nonetheless, the bill has been criticized for not providing enough flexibility to schools for disciplining students on a case-by-case basis, preferring instead mandatory suspensions for a wide range of behaviour including verbal abuse and physical violence.  A report commissioned by the Ontario Human Rights Commission concluded that "there is a strong perception supported by some empirical evidence that the Act and school board policies are having a disproportionate impact on racial minority students, particularly Black students, and students with disabilities."

External links and references 
Bill 81, The Safe Schools Act

Ontario law
2000 in Canadian law
2000 in Ontario